Edward Arthur Seykota (born August 7, 1946) is a commodities trader, who earned S.B. degrees in Electrical Engineering from MIT and Management from the MIT Sloan School of Management, both in 1969. In 1970 he pioneered Systems trading by using early punched card computers to test ideas on trading the markets.  Seykota resided in Incline Village, Nevada, on the north shore of Lake Tahoe, but recently moved to Texas.

Career 
As a young man he attended high school near The Hague, Netherlands and also lived in Voorburg.

In 1970, he pioneered a computerized trading system (now known as Trading System) for the futures market for the brokerage house he and Michael Marcus were working for. Later, he decided to venture out on his own and manage a few of his client's accounts.

Much of Seykota's success was attributed to his development and utilization of computerized trading systems to which he first tested on a mainframe IBM computer. Later on, the brokerage house he had been working for adopted his system for their trades.

His interest in creating a computerized system was spawned after he read a letter by Richard Donchian on utilizing mechanical trend following systems for trading and also Donchian's 5- and 20-day moving average system.  He was also inspired by the book Reminiscences of a Stock Operator by Edwin Lefèvre. His first trading system was developed based on exponential moving averages.

Ed Seykota, Market Wizards

Seykota improved this system over time, adapting the system to fit his trading style and preferences. With the initial version of the system being rigid, he later introduced more rules into the system in addition to pattern triggers and money management algorithms.

Another aspect of his success was his genuine love for trading and his optimistic demeanour. This factor sustained his efforts to continuously improve on his system although he never changed the response indicators of the system and instead fine tuned market stimuli.

The Trading Tribe 
In 1992, Seykota gathered together a group of traders to discuss their emotions, due to his concern that traders often allow their emotions to overrule their logic. They start gathering regularly and Seykota develops methods to support personal growth. Over the years it expands to include Tribes all over the world and people in many professions. Members help to develop a common set of practices Seykota calls TTP, the Trading Tribe Process. He describes these ideas and practices in his book The Trading Tribe (2005) and its refinement in an online article called TTP Extensions: Replacing the Zero-Point Process with the Rocks Process (2013).

Books 
The Trading Tribe (2005)
Govopoly in the 39th Day (2013)

Influence 
In Market Wizards, Updated: Interviews With Top Traders, author Jack D. Schwager devotes a chapter to Seykota and writes that his "achievements must certainly rank him as one of the best traders of our time."

References

Further reading

Magazines

External links

Further reading 

1946 births
American commodities traders
American financial analysts
American hedge fund managers
American money managers
American stock traders
Living people
MIT Sloan School of Management alumni
Pseudoscientific physicists
Stock and commodity market managers
People from Incline Village, Nevada